Steven John Doszpot  (23 September 1948 – 25 November 2017) was an Australian politician and member of the Australian Capital Territory Legislative Assembly from 2008 to 2017. A member of the Liberal Party, he represented the electorate of Brindabella between 2008 and 2012, Molonglo from 2012 to 2016, and Kurrajong from 2016 to his death in 2017. In December 2012, Doszpot was elected as the Assistant Speaker.

Biography 
He was born as István Doszpot in Budapest, Hungary and in 1957, aged nine, migrated to Australia with his refugee parents after the Hungarian Revolution of 1956. He completed his secondary education at the Christian Brothers' High School, Lewisham (1961–64). He moved to Canberra in 1974 and was involved in the computer industry as a senior executive with Wang Computers (Australia), Digital Equipment Corporation and Canon Australia, with a brief stint at the CSIRO ICT Centre as the Business Development Manager in Canberra, before his election to the ACT Legislative Assembly in 2008.

He was the Head of SOCOG in Canberra from 1998 to 2000, and managed the Olympic Football Tournament staged in Canberra as part of the Sydney 2000 Olympic Games. He was President of the ACT Olympic Council and Soccer Canberra and a Fellow of the Australian Institute of Company Directors. Following the 2000 Olympic Games, he was awarded the Australian Sports Medal for his long-term commitment and service to the sport.

Doszpot was the Shadow Minister for Education and Training and the Shadow Minister for Sport and Recreation from 2008; the Shadow Minister for Ageing and the Shadow Minister for ICT from 2012. He had previously held shadow portfolios for Multicultural Affairs and for Disability between 2008 and 2012. He was also the Chair of the ACT Assembly Standing Committee on Health, Community and Social Services from 2008.

On 24 October 2017, Doszpot announced that he would be resigning from the Legislative Assembly on 5 December, after being diagnosed with terminal liver cancer. However, he died from the disease on 25 November, becoming the first Member of the Legislative Assembly to die in office. He was given a state funeral.

See also

2008 Australian Capital Territory general election
2012 Australian Capital Territory general election
Members of the Australian Capital Territory Legislative Assembly, 2008–2012
Members of the Australian Capital Territory Legislative Assembly, 2012–2016

References

|-

1948 births
2017 deaths
Liberal Party of Australia members of the Australian Capital Territory Legislative Assembly
Hungarian emigrants to Australia
Members of the Australian Capital Territory Legislative Assembly
Recipients of the Australian Sports Medal
21st-century Australian politicians
Deaths from cancer in the Australian Capital Territory
Deaths from liver cancer
Politicians from Budapest
Recipients of the Medal of the Order of Australia
Fellows of the Australian Institute of Company Directors